Freedtown (Earnestville) was a former community in Pasco County, Florida, located just south of Buddy Lake. The 19th century town was founded sometime prior to December 1886. It was a "freedtown", meaning it was a town populated mostly by freedmen. The town gradually ceased to exist after the Great Freeze of 1894–1895, and none of its buildings or its cemetery remain today. The approximate location is said to have been somewhere west of Fort King Road along Bozeman Road.

See also
List of freedmen's towns

References

Former populated places in Pasco County, Florida
Former populated places in Florida